Tinti is a surname. Notable people with the surname include:

Camillo Tinti (born c. 1738), Italian painter
Gabriele Tinti (actor) (1932–1991), Italian actor
Gabriele Tinti (poet) (born 1979), Italian writer
Giovanni Battista Tinti (1558-1617), Italian painter of the Renaissance period
Hannah Tinti (born 1973), American writer and the co-founder of One Story magazine
Lorenzo Tinti (1626–1672), Italian painter and engraver of the Baroque period
Nicoletta Tinti (born 1979), Italian rhythmic gymnast

See also 
Tinti-Oulen, is a town and sub-prefecture in the Kankan Prefecture in the Kankan Region of eastern Guinea